Adrenaline Rush: The Science of Risk is a 2002 IMAX documentary film that explores the human biology behind risk-taking—why it gives some people such a powerful physical lift, and why the human mind and body craves danger. In addition, filmmaker Marc Fafard presents an up-close look at two of the most dangerous and exciting human pastimes: parachuting and base-jumping.

References

External links

2002 films
2002 short documentary films
Canadian sports documentary films
IMAX short films
IMAX documentary films
2000s English-language films
2000s Canadian films